Raffaella Ida Rumiati is professor of cognitive neuroscience at the International School for Advanced Studies [Scuola Internazionale Superiore di Studi Avanzati], (SISSA), Italy. She sits on the editorial board of the journal Cognitive Neuropsychology, and is an action editor for the journal Brain and Cognition. Rumiati is also a member of the steering committee of the European Workshop on Cognitive Neuropsychology. and a member of The NeuroGenderings Network.

Education 
Rumiati trained for her PhD under the tutelage of professor Glyn W. Humphreys.

References

External links 
 



Italian cognitive neuroscientists
Developmental psychologists
Living people
Italian women neuroscientists
Year of birth missing (living people)